Herivelto de Oliveira Martins (also Herivelto Martins) (Engenheiro Paulo de Frontin, Brazil, January 30, 1912 – Rio de Janeiro, September 17, 1992) was a Brazilian composer, singer, and music player.

Martins was the author of many classic Brazilian songs, especially sambas. They include:
 Da cor do meu violão
 Ave Maria no Morro
 Praça onze
 Que rei sou eu?

Martins formed the Trio de Ouro group in 1936 with Nilo Chagas and his wife, Dalva de Oliveira.  Martin's son, Pery Ribeiro, became a highly successful singer of Bossa Nova, and Música popular brasileira and Jazz.

Selected filmography
 Berlin to the Samba Beat (1944)

External links
 Martin's Biography  at Cliquemusic 

1912 births
1992 deaths
Brazilian male composers
20th-century Brazilian male singers
20th-century Brazilian singers
20th-century composers